Kawaala is a neighborhood within Kampala, Uganda's capital and largest city.

Location
Kawaala is bordered by Nabweru to the north, Kazo to the northeast, Makerere to the east, Naakulabye to the south, Kasubi to the southwest, and Namungoona to the west. The coordinates of Kawaala are 0°20'24.0"N, 32°33'00.0"E (Latitude:0.3400; Longitude:32.5500).

Overview
Kawaala is peaceful residential neighborhood, with an occasional middle and high-class residence. The Kampala Northern Bypass Highway passes through Kawaala. Some of the points of interest in the neighborhood include the following:
 Good Times Infant School - A private K-P7, mixed day school.
 Trinity Family Nursery and Primary School - A private Nursery-P7, mixed day school.
 Kawaala Health Center III - A health facility, owned and operated by Kampala Capital City Authority (KCCA).
 Glory of Christ Church -  A place of worship affiliated with the Pentecostal Movement

See also
 Kampala District
 Kampala Northern Bypass Highway
 Lubaga Division
 Kasubi Tombs

References

External links
  Crime Shock

Neighborhoods of Kampala
Lubaga Division